Bruno Coutinho Martins  (born 21 June 1986 in Porto Alegre) is a Brazilian attacking midfielder.

In February 2014, Bruno transferred to China League One side Shenzhen Ruby. Coutinho last played for Tokyo Verdy in the J. League Division 2.

Honours
Jagiellonia Białystok
 Polish Cup: 2010

References

External links
 
 
 
 

 Bruno Coutinho Martins career stats at jagiellonia.neostrada.pl 

1986 births
Living people
Brazilian footballers
Sportspeople from Rio Grande do Sul
Brazilian expatriate footballers
Grêmio Foot-Ball Porto Alegrense players
América Futebol Clube (RN) players
Club Nacional de Football players
Jagiellonia Białystok players
Polonia Warsaw players
Hapoel Tel Aviv F.C. players
FC Astra Giurgiu players
Esporte Clube Pelotas players
Shenzhen F.C. players
China League One players
J2 League players
Tokyo Verdy players
Ekstraklasa players
Israeli Premier League players
Liga I players
Expatriate footballers in Uruguay
Expatriate footballers in Poland
Brazilian expatriate sportspeople in Poland
Expatriate footballers in Romania
Brazilian expatriate sportspeople in Romania
Expatriate footballers in China
Brazilian expatriate sportspeople in China
Expatriate footballers in Japan
Brazilian expatriate sportspeople in Japan
Association football midfielders